Zhongshan Hospital, formerly Chung Shan Memorial Hospital, is a major teaching hospital in Shanghai, China, affiliated with the Shanghai Medical College of Fudan University.

History 
The hospital was built in 1935 and officially opened on 1 April 1937 as one of the largest Chinese-owned hospitals in Shanghai. Its name commemorates President Sun Yat-Sen (Sun Zhongshan). The director of the hospital's preparatory committee was H. H. Kung, and Sun Fo, the son of Sun Yat-sen, served as vice director. Niu Huisheng (牛惠生) was appointed as the hospital's first president. The family of Shi Liangcai made significant donations to establish a nursing school in the hospital.

Facilities 
Zhongshan Hospital is a major teaching hospital affiliated with the Shanghai Medical College of Fudan University and was named one of China's "100 Best Hospitals" in 1999.

It has 2,005 beds serving 100,000 inpatients and four million outpatients and emergencies each year. There are three branches located at 1474 Yan’an Road, Xuhui District, Tianma Hill, Songjiang District, and Qingpu District. It has more than 4,000 employees, including more than 600 professor-level physicians, two members of the Chinese Academy of Sciences and two members of the Chinese Academy of Engineering.

The hospital includes all clinical specialties except pediatrics. It has been designated as the Shanghai Clinical Center for Cardiovascular Diseases and Liver Cancer. Having their head offices set up in the hospital, the Shanghai Institute of Cardiovascular Diseases, the Liver Cancer Institute of Fudan University, the Institute of Vascular Surgery of Fudan University and the Nuclear Medicine Institute of Fudan University have become the major research centers of the hospital. The Organ Transplantation Center, Fudan University, is another feature of the hospital.

List of presidents
Niu Huisheng
Ying Yuanyue
Shen Kefei
Huang Jiasi
Cui Zhiyi
Lin Zhaoqi
Qiu Lin
Wang Chengpei
Lin Gui
Yang Binghui
Wang Yuqi
Fan Jia (incumbent)

References

External links

Teaching hospitals in Shanghai
Fudan University
1937 establishments in China
Hospitals established in 1937
Xuhui District